Jerry Dobrovolny (born July 24, 1961) is a Canadian civil engineer, civic administrator, and retired football player. In November 2019, he is slated to begin serving as chief administrative officer and commissioner for Metro Vancouver Regional District, having previously served as chief engineer and general manager of Engineering Services for the City of Vancouver, and as a city councillor in New Westminster. 

In his football career, he was an offensive tackle who played for four seasons for the Calgary Stampeders, Montreal Concordes, Montreal Alouettes, and Ottawa Rough Riders. He was drafted first overall in the 1983 CFL Draft by the Stampeders. He played college football for the UBC Thunderbirds.

References

1961 births
Living people
Players of Canadian football from British Columbia
Canadian football offensive linemen
Sportspeople from New Westminster
UBC Thunderbirds football players
Calgary Stampeders players
Montreal Concordes players
Montreal Alouettes players
Ottawa Rough Riders players
Canadian sportsperson-politicians
British Columbia municipal councillors